This is a list of Kentucky Wildcats football bowl games. The Kentucky Wildcats are the men's and women's intercollegiate athletic squads of the University of Kentucky (UK), a founding member of the Southeastern Conference. The list shows the bowl played in, score, date, season, opponent, stadium, location, attendance and head coach.

Key

Bowl games

Footnotes

References
General

Kentucky Wildcats

Kentucky Wildcats bowl games